Charles A. Rosenthal (born February 7, 1946) is an American lawyer and former District Attorney of Harris County, Texas.

Life and career
Born in Alice, Texas, and raised Baptist, Rosenthal attended Houston public schools, received his undergraduate degree from Baylor University, and went to law school at South Texas College of Law. He served as Harris County assistant district attorney under Carol Vance starting in March 1977.

After his predecessor, Johnny Holmes, retired, Rosenthal was elected Harris County District Attorney after facing Pat Lykos, County Attorney Michael Stafford and many others in the Republican primary. He was re-elected in 2004.

On March 26, 2003, he argued before the Supreme Court of the United States in Lawrence v. Texas that laws against sodomy are constitutional. The Court disagreed, holding 6-3 that prosecutions for private sexual conduct violates the United States Constitution. His performance was later described as "the worst oral argument in years", but some believe his lack of preparation reflected his lack of enthusiasm for the statute he was defending.

On February 15, 2008, Rosenthal resigned as Harris County district attorney, following the filing of a lawsuit petitioning for his removal from office. The press release issued by Rosenthal suggests substance abuse played a part in his decision. Rosenthal's official release claims, "Although I have enjoyed excellent medical and pharmacological treatment, I have come to learn that the particular combination of drugs prescribed for me in the past has caused some impairment in my judgment."

Controversies

In a federal court case, emails in the Harris County District Attorney's office were under subpoena.  Some of those emails exposed his extramarital affair with his secretary as well as being found to be using government computers for campaigning and receiving and sending racist emails.

After an emergency meeting with local GOP leaders, the GOP asked him to step aside and to not seek reelection. On January 4, 2008, he announced that he would not seek reelection, but would finish out his current term.

Other controversies included:
Multiple Houston-area community groups called for Rosenthal's resignation, as well as the resignation of Harris County sheriff Tommy Thomas for similarly racist e-mails.  Community groups are sensitive to racism because Rosenthal "presides over an office that sends more convicts to death row than any other prosecutor's office in the nation."
The Texas attorney general's office investigated whether e-mails discovered in the DA's county computer were evidence of criminal activity, such as Rosenthal's alleged use of public assets to engage in his now-withdrawn political re-election campaign.
32 indictments were thrown out due to a paperwork snafu under Rosenthal's watch.
Approved a former lover's $11,000 raise
On 28-March-2008, Rosenthal was found in contempt of court for destroying 2,500 e-mails subpoenaed in a federal court case.
Harris County taxpayers paid US$400 per hour for attorney fees to represent Rosenthal in his contempt hearing.  Although the contract was capped at US$50,000, taxpayers were expected to pay the full bill.
Refusal to sign an agreement between Venezuela and the United States to allow the extradition of Jesus Salazar, who is wanted for the October 1999 murder of 17-year-old Felicia Ruiz, in exchange for Salazar agreeing to a 30-year prison sentence instead of a life-term.

Personal life
Rosenthal is married to Cindy Rosenthal, a retired FBI Special Agent.

See also
Podcast of the oral arguments before the US Supreme Court in Lawrence v. Texas

References

External links
Welcome to the Harris County District Attorney's Office Note: Rosenthal has resigned as Harris County District Attorney as of February 15, 2008.

County district attorneys in Texas
Living people
1946 births
Baylor University alumni
South Texas College of Law alumni
People from Alice, Texas
Texas Republicans
Baptists from Texas
Lawyers from Houston